In numerology, some New Age believers often link 11:11 to chance or coincidence. It is an example of synchronicity. For instance, those who are seeing 11:11 on a clock often claim it as an auspicious sign or signaling a spirit presence. 

Post-hoc reasoning and confirmation bias provide a context for such claims, and skeptics have pointed out that the assertions of people like Uri Geller that 11:11 is somehow important in world events do not hold up to even cursory scrutiny.

Significance in Christianity 
Within Protestant Christianity, especially Pentecostal movements, the number 11 or 11:11 has been associated with transition.

Significance in dates 
For various reasons, people ascribe different kinds of significance to dates and numbers. For example, "the eleventh hour of the eleventh day of the eleventh month," 11:00 a.m. (Paris time) on November 11, 1918, was when the armistice ending World War I came into effect.

11 November 2011, or "11/11/11" saw an increase in the number of marriages taking place in different areas throughout the world, including the United States, and across the Asian continent.

See also 
Law of Fives
23 enigma
Apophenia

References 

Numerology
New Age
Superstitions about numbers